Megerella is a monotypic genus of brachiopods belonging to the family Kraussinidae. The only species is Megerella hilleri.

References

Terebratulida
Brachiopod genera
Monotypic brachiopod genera